James Andrew Tomsula (born April 14, 1968) is an American football coach who is the head coach for the Rhein Fire of the European League of Football (ELF). Serving as a defensive coach throughout his career, Tomsula has also been the head coach for the Rhein Fire of NFL Europe and the San Francisco 49ers of the National Football League (NFL). Tomsula was born and raised in the Pittsburgh suburb of Homestead.  Attending Catawba College, he played defensive end from 1987 to 1990, after transferring from Middle Tennessee State University after the 1986 season. At Catawba College, Tomsula made 109 tackles in two seasons.

Coaching career

Catawba College
Tomsula began his coaching career as a strength and conditioning coach at Catawba College in 1989. After serving as an assistant coach at Charleston Southern under Defensive Coordinator Fred Hamilton from 1992 to 1995, he returned to Catawba College where he was a member of the coaching staff until 2005 and helped lead the Catawba Indians to four South Atlantic Conference Championships. Notably, Tomsula was inducted into the Catawba College Sports Hall of Fame 2015.

NFL Europe
Tomsula was an assistant for several years in NFL Europe. He was the defensive line coach for the London Monarchs in 1998 and for the Scottish Claymores from 1999 to 2003. In 2004, he became the defensive coordinator for the Berlin Thunder, a position he held for the 2004 and 2005 seasons. Tomsula became the head coach of the Rhein Fire for the 2006 season. The Fire would finish the season with a 6–4 record, but did not qualify for the playoffs.

San Francisco 49ers

Assistant coach
The 49ers hired Tomsula to serve as their defensive line coach during the 2007 season and he remained in that role through the 2014 season. During the 2010 season, Tomsula was named interim head coach for the Week 17 game versus the Arizona Cardinals, after head coach Mike Singletary was fired with one game remaining in the season. He won his first game as 49ers head coach, 38–7 over the Arizona Cardinals. For the 2011 season, incoming new head coach Jim Harbaugh retained Tomsula in his previous position as defensive line coach where he would remain through all four seasons of the Harbaugh era.

Head coach
On January 14, 2015, Tomsula became the 49ers' head coach, succeeding Jim Harbaugh, who had been forced out by 49ers CEO Jed York.

Tomsula employed new coaching practices, which included giving his players breaks to check social media during meetings, shorter, easier practices, and more days off. The result was one of the worst offenses in team history. Scoring only 238 points, the 49ers would struggle to a 5–11 season, with Colin Kaepernick ending the season on injured reserve after being benched. The 49ers would ultimately be eliminated from postseason contention in Week 14 of the 2015 regular season.

Tomsula was fired just a few hours after the 49ers' season finale against the St. Louis Rams, which the 49ers won 19–16 in overtime. On January 4, 2016, York confirmed that the 49ers would pay Tomsula $14 million for his one season as head coach.

Washington Redskins
On January 23, 2017, Tomsula was hired as defensive line coach for the Washington Redskins.

Dallas Cowboys 
On January 8, 2020, Tomsula was hired as the defensive line coach for the Dallas Cowboys. On January 8, 2021, Tomsula was fired along with defensive coordinator Mike Nolan.

Rhein Fire 
In the 2022 preseason the management of the new Rhein Fire announced that former NFL Europe Rhein Fire head coach Jim Tomsula will also be the first head coach for the upcoming season of the European League of Football. In their inaugural season, Tomsula coached the expansion Rhein Fire to a 7-5 record, the second best in the Southern Conference; though the team failed to qualify for the post-season.

Head coaching record

NFL Europe

NFL

*Interim head coach

ELF

Personal life
Tomsula's grandfather, James J. Tomsula (1916–2012), was a son of immigrants from Hungary and served in the United States Navy during World War II. He is a devout Roman Catholic, but does not push his views on others, stating that "God takes care of everything...I don't give anyone religion lessons."

Tomsula has worked as a medical equipment sales representative, newspaper delivery man, firefighter, night janitor, firewood cutter, department store floor cleaner, food sales representative, and doormat salesman.

References

External links
 San Francisco 49ers profile

1968 births
Living people
American expatriate sportspeople in Scotland
American football defensive linemen
American expatriate sportspeople in Germany
American people of Hungarian descent
American people of Italian descent
Berlin Thunder coaches
Catawba Indians football coaches
Catawba Indians football players
Catholics from Pennsylvania
Charleston Southern Buccaneers football coaches
Dallas Cowboys coaches
London Monarchs coaches
Middle Tennessee Blue Raiders football players
Rhein Fire coaches
San Francisco 49ers coaches
San Francisco 49ers head coaches
Scottish Claymores coaches
High school football coaches in Pennsylvania
People from Homestead, Pennsylvania
Players of American football from Pennsylvania
Washington Redskins coaches
Players of American football from San Jose, California
European League of Football coaches
American expatriate sportspeople in England